The 1999 Belgian Cup Final, took place on 30 May 1999 between Lierse and Standard Liège. It was the 44th Belgian Cup final and was won by Lierse.

Route to the final

Match

Details

External links
  
 RSSSF Belgium Cups 1998/99

Belgian Cup finals
Cup Final